Persatuan Sepakbola Indonesia Kabupaten Bogor 1973, commonly known as Persikabo 1973 or by its nickname 'Kabo '73, is an Indonesian professional football club based in Bogor Regency, West Java that competes in Liga 1.

History
This club started from an initiative to participate in the 2015 Piala Jenderal Sudirman tournament with a team that incorporated players from the professional PSMS Medan club into the Indonesian National Armed Forces (TNI)'s amateur club, PS TNI. After this tournament, PS TNI parted ways with PSMS Medan but decided to become a professional club that combines soldiers with professional players. In March 2016, PS TNI appointed their first professional coach, Englishman Judan Ali and acquired Persiram Raja Ampat, a cash-strapped first-tier team from the impoverished West Papua province, for a cost of 17 billion rupiah.

For the 2018 Liga 1 season, PS TNI were renamed as PS TIRA to dilute the TNI association and moved to Bantul. The team finished 2018 Liga 1 in 15th position and escaped relegation after securing a vital 3-1 win against Borneo F.C. in the last match of the season. PS TIRA later merged with Liga 3 club Persikabo Bogor in early 2019 to form TIRA-Persikabo and play at Pakansari Stadium in Bogor Regency.

Ahead of the 2020 Liga 1 season, TIRA-Persikabo changed its name to Persikabo 1973. But they used the name TIRA-Persikabo and the same logo for the 2020 Liga 1 season because these changes were not approved by the Football Association of Indonesia (PSSI). During its May 2021 annual congress, PSSI said the club cancelled the plan to propose for a name change. But they used the name Persikabo 1973 as a commercial arrangement for the 2021–22 Liga 1 season.

Season to season record

Colours and badges

Stadium

When competing in 2016 Indonesian Soccer Championship as PS TNI, the club played at  Siliwangi Stadium in Bandung. For the 2017 Liga 1 season, they moved to Pakansari Stadium, and moved again to Sultan Agung Stadium in Bantul for the 2018 season. As the result of their merger with Persikabo Bogor, the club in 2019 returned to Pakansari to play their home matches.

Supporter 

Persikabo has a fan base in Bogor Regency and spread across the Greater Jakarta area, they have become one of the representatives of a football club in West Java with a Sundanese identity. Kabomania is the name for the club's supporters who are all over the stands. There are other, more exclusive supporter groups, UPCS is a group that only fills in the south stand at the Pakansari Stadium.

Rivalries 
 Super Jabodetabek Derby
Rivalry with Persija Jakarta also know as Jagorawi derbies has been going on from their supporters since 2008 and has become a new rival for clubs with adjacent locations.

 Pasundan Derby
The match with Persib Bandung also know as West Java derbies is a big match with the fight for the best in West Java.

Players

Current squad

Out on loan

Staff

Coaches

References

External links
 

Bogor Regency
Football clubs in Indonesia
Football clubs in West Java
2015 establishments in Indonesia
Association football clubs established in 2015
Military association football clubs in Indonesia
PS TIRA